Moran Mor Ignatius Aphrem II ( Moran Mor Ignaṭius Afrem Trayono,  Iġnāṭīūs Afrām al-Ṯānī; born as Saʿid Karim on 3 May 1965) is a Syrian-American Christian prelate who has served as the Patriarch of the Syriac Orthodox Church since 29 May 2014. 

Before his election to the patriarchate, he was the Syriac Orthodox Archbishop of the Eastern United States, and was known as Mor Cyril Aphrem Karim in that post. In that role he established 11 new parishes, introducing a number of new programs for the youth, and worked for inter-church unity.

Early life and education
Saʿid Karim was born in Qamishli, north-eastern Syria, on 3 May 1965, the youngest son of Issa and Khanema Karim. His family are Syriac Orthodox Assyrians / Syriacs who originally came from the village Ëḥwo (Turkish: Güzelsu) in the Tur Abdin region of Mardin Province, Turkey.

After finishing primary schooling in Qamishli in 1977, Karim received his religious secondary education at St. Ephrem's Theological Seminary in Atchaneh, Bikfaya, Lebanon. After completing school in 1982, he worked in Aleppo, Syria, as an assistant to the Archbishop Mor Gregorios Yuhanna Ibrahim. From 1984 to 1988, he attended the Coptic Theological Seminary in Cairo, Egypt, receiving a Bachelor of Arts degree in Divinity.

In 1985, Saʿid Karim took the vows of a monk, and changed his name to Aphrem in honor of the 4th-century Syriac poet-theologian Ephrem the Syrian and former patriarch Aphrem I Barsoum. He was ordained deacon, and, later that year, was elevated to the sacred priesthood. From 1988 to 1989, he served as both the secretary to his patriarchal predecessor, Ignatius Zakka I Iwas, and as a teacher at St Ephrem's Theological Seminary in Damascus, Syria.

In 1991, he entered St Patrick's College in Maynooth, Ireland, from where he received a Licentiate of Sacred Theology (1992) and Doctor of Divinity (1994). His doctoral thesis was titled The Symbolism of the Cross in early Syriac Christianity. During that time, he also served as a priest to the Syriac Orthodox Community in the United Kingdom.

Metropolitan Archbishop of the Eastern United States
In 1995, following the death of Archbishop Mor Athanasius Yeshue Samuel, who had established the Archdiocese of the United States and Canada, it was decided to divide the territory into three archdioceses: the Eastern United States, Los Angeles and Environs, and Canada. Aphrem Karim was appointed archbishop of the Eastern United States territory.

On January 28, 1996, Aphrem Karim was consecrated as Metropolitan Archbishop and Patriarchal Vicar of the Archdiocese for the Eastern United States by Patriarch Ignatius Zakka I Iwas at St. Mary's Syriac Orthodox Church in his home town of Qamishli. Taking the episcopal name Cyril, he arrived in the United States on March 2, 1996, and was officially installed at St. Mark's Syriac Orthodox Cathedral in Teaneck, New Jersey, as Mor Cyril Aphrem Karim.

During his time as Metropolitan Archbishop, Cyril Aphrem Karim oversaw the creation of 11 new parishes, bringing the total parishes in the archdiocese to 20.  He created an advisory council to aid in oversight and administration of the archdiocese.  He created the Syriac Orthodox Archdiocesan Youth Organization to coordinate youth activities across the archdiocese's parishes, and oversaw a number of youth conferences as he sought to grow the church.  He organized a special youth liturgy in the New York/New Jersey area and created a choral society.

Cyril Aphrem Karim oversaw the creation of the Archdiocesan Sunday School Committee to unite lesson plans across the archdiocese. He created a pre-marriage counseling program which afforded couples-to-be the chance to meet with him personally.  He also established an annual liturgy service to recognize and appreciate the elderly members of the community.  He worked for inter-church unity, serving on the World Council of Churches.  Cyril Aphrem Karim played a significant role in founding Christian Churches Together.

Patriarch of Antioch
On 21 March 2014, Patriarch Ignatius Zakka I Iwas died after a long illness. Following his death, the Holy Synod of the Syriac Orthodox Church of Antioch was convened to elect a successor. The synod was held at St Jacob Baradeus Monastery in Atchaneh, Lebanon, presided over by Mor Baison Thoma I Catholicos of India and Mor Severius Jamil Hawa Archbishop of Baghdad and Basra, the Patriarchal Locum Tenens. The synod elected Cyril Aphrem bin Karim to be the 122nd successor of St. Peter in the Apostolic See of Antioch. He was enthroned on 29 May 2014, at St Ephrem's Monastery, Maarat Saidnaya, near Damascus, Syria.  Baselios Thomas I oversaw the ceremony.

Karim took the patriarchal name Ignatius, replacing his episcopal name Cyril, and, being the second patriarch to bear the monastic name Aphrem (the first being Ignatius Aphrem I Barsoum), his name became Ignatius Aphrem II. Unlike his immediate predecessors, but following older convention, Aphrem II chose not to use his family name, Karim, in his official title.

In 2016, Ignatius said "Russia has given hope to the people of Syria," in support of the Russian military intervention in Syria during the Syrian Civil War.

Apostolic visits
Since his enthronement, he has made many  apostolic visits between Iraq and Syria to assist Christians displaced by the advance of ISIS and the general turmoil caused by the Syrian Civil War. The Patriarch celebrated New Year 2015 with refugees and displaced Christians in Northern Iraq. Patriarchal Liturgy was served along with special prayers.

He undertook a pastoral visit to India from 7–19 February 2015. He consecrated churches like St Mary's Church in Marady, St Peter's Church in Peechanikkadu, St George Monastery in Malecruz, St Thomas Church in Madras (Chennai) etc. which are under Jacobite Syrian orthodox Church.

Styles
The titulary of patriarchs is somewhat complex and changeable. He is often called "His Holiness", a special distinction given to the leaders of some churches ( Qaddišuṯeh,  Qadāsa). This is often then followed by the unique Syriac title Mor, often doubled to Moran Mor. The title, in its singular form, literally means "my lord", and is given to all male saints and bishops. The term Moran means "our lord", and, used alone refers only to Jesus Christ, but is combined with Mor in the titles of patriarchs. Patriarchs are addressed as either Mor or Moran Mor.

Patriarchs take the patriarchal name Ignatius in honor of the martyr Ignatius of Antioch, starting with the accession of Ignatius Behnam of Hadl in 1445.  Ignatius Aphrem II chose a different spelling of the name Ignatius by omitting the Syriac letter olaph from the spelling of the "a" vowel. This is followed by the patriarch's personal monastic name Aphrem, and the regnal number "II" to distinguish him from Ignatius Aphrem I Barsoum.  Ignatius Aphrem II does not use his family name, "Karim", in his patriarchal title, although he is informally referred to as "Ignatius Aphrem II Karim".

The patriarch is Patriarch of Antioch, to which is added "and All the East" as that see governs the church in the east. He is also Supreme Head of the Church, a similar title to those used by other denominational leaders.

An ancient title of Syriac patriarchs still sometimes used is "Thrice Blessed" ( Tlithoy Ṭuḇe), usually placed instead of "His Holiness". The patriarch is often greeted in Arabic as  Sayyidnā ("our lord").

Personal names
At various points in his life, Ignatius Aphrem II was known as
 Saʿid Karim (1965–1985)
 The Reverend Monk Aphrem Karim (1985–1996)
 His Eminence Mor Cyril Aphrem Karim (1996–2014)
 His Holiness Moran Mor Ignatius Aphrem II (2014–present)

Personal life
Ignatius Aphrem II speaks Classical Syriac (Kthobonoyo), Turoyo (a colloquial Neo-Aramaic spoken in his ancestral Tur Abdin), Arabic, French and English.

Suicide attack 
On Sunday 19 June 2016, an ISIS affiliated suicide bomber tried to assassinate Ignatius Aphrem II during a special ceremony commemorating the 101st anniversary of the Ottoman genocide against Armenians, Arameans and Greeks. Three security officers were killed and five people injured; the Patriarch Mor Ignatius Aphrem II was unharmed.

2018 missile strikes against Syria 
In April 2018, Ignatius Aphrem II, together with Patriarch John X of Antioch issued a strong condemnation of the 2018 missile strikes against Syria. They said the bombing  "were clear violation of the international laws and the UN Charter", and that the "unjust aggression encourages the terrorist organizations and gives them momentum to continue in their terrorism."

Publications
In 2003, Cyril Aphrem Karim published the Book of the Order for the Burial of the Clergy. He also saw to the reprint of works including the Shorter Catechism of the Syriac Orthodox Church of Antioch (1999) by former Patriarch Ignatius Aphrem I Barsoum, and the Book of Scripture Readings for Sundays and Feasts Days (2000), originally published by Mor Philoxenus Yuhanon Dolabani of Mardin. Cyril Aphrem Karim encouraged the American Foundation for Syriac Studies to publish a quarterly entitled Syriac Studies and helped co-sponsor a series of public lectures by scholars and intellectuals on Syriac culture, history, literature and theology. In 2004, Cyril Aphrem Karim wrote Symbols of the Cross in the Writings of the Early Syriac Fathers.  He has also published two children's books: In The Tree House and Animals from the Bible.

Bibliography

References

External links

1965 births
Syrian Oriental Orthodox Christians
Living people
People from Qamishli
Syrian archbishops
Syriac Orthodox Patriarchs of Antioch
Alumni of St Patrick's College, Maynooth
20th-century Oriental Orthodox archbishops
21st-century Oriental Orthodox archbishops
Recipients of the Order of Sankt Ignatios